Vike Church is a parish church of the Church of Norway in Alver Municipality in Vestland county, Norway. It is located in the village of Vikanes, along the Romarheimsfjorden. It is one of two churches in the Osterfjorden parish which is part of the Nordhordland prosti (deanery) in the Diocese of Bjørgvin. The white, wooden church was built in a rectangular design in 1891 using plans drawn up by the architect Johannes Øvsthus. The church seats about 200 people.

History
In 1875, a cemetery was built in Vikanes. Soon after, people began asking for a chapel to be built by the cemetery. Around 1890, plans were made to built a chapel at the site. The parish hired Johannes Øvsthus to design the building and Askild S. Heldal was hired as the lead builder. The church was completed and consecrated in 1891. In 1951, the church received electricity for light and heat. It was renovated in 1967 under the direction of architect Claus Lindstrøm. Then in 1991, under the direction of architect Einar Vaardal-Lunde, the church was renovated again, this time the church porch was rebuilt as well.

Media gallery

See also
List of churches in Bjørgvin

References

Alver (municipality)
Churches in Vestland
Rectangular churches in Norway
Wooden churches in Norway
19th-century Church of Norway church buildings
Churches completed in 1891
1891 establishments in Norway